Parkak (also known as Parkag) is a village in Milajerd Rural District, Milajerd District, Komijan County, Markazi Province, Iran. At the 2006 census, its population was 26, in 5 families.

References 

Populated places in Komijan County